Harrimania is a genus of worms belonging to the family Harrimaniidae.

The species of this genus are found in Europe.

Species:

Harrimania borealis 
Harrimania kupfferi 
Harrimania maculosa 
Harrimania planktophilus

References

Enteropneusta
Hemichordate genera